Declan O'Mahony is a Gaelic footballer who plays for the Ballyboden St Enda's club and for the Dublin county team. He won the 2007 O'Byrne Cup for Dublin against Laois at O'Connor Park in Offaly. The game finished on a scoreline of 1-18 to 2-13 against Laois. He finished the tournament with a total of 1-03.

References

Year of birth missing (living people)
Living people
Ballyboden St Enda's Gaelic footballers
Dublin inter-county Gaelic footballers